NY Ink is an American reality documentary television series that debuted June 2, 2011 on TLC. TLC renewed the series for a second season in August 2011, also noting that the series' first season averaged 1.3 million viewers per episode. Filming for the third season started in August 2012 with the season premiering on April 4, 2013.

Premise
After Miami Ink (2004–2008) ended, tattoo artist Ami James moved to New York City in 2011 to fulfill his dream of opening a new tattoo studio, which he named the Wooster St. Social Club (now called Five Points Tattoo, located on 127 Lafayette Street. Open everyday from 12pm to 8pm). James was joined again by producers David Roma and Charlie Corwin to detail the proceedings in the shop on NY Ink.

Opening
The series intro is narrated by James:

Cast

Main Cast
 Ami James - Owner/Artist
 Tim Hendricks - Artist (Season 1-2)
 Tommy Montoya - Artist
 Megan Massacre - Artist 
 Chris Torres - Artist (Season 1-2)
 Billy DeCola - Apprentice/Artist (Season 1-2)
 Robear † - Floor Manager (Season 1-2)
 Jessica Gahring - Shop Manager (Season 1-2)
 Rodrigo Canteras - Artist (Season 3) 
 Mike Diamond - Shop Manager (Season 3)
 Yoji Harada † - Artist (Season 3, Guest Season 2)
 Lee Rodriguez - Artist (Season 3, Recurring Season 2)
 Jes Leppard - Front Desk (Season 3)

Minor Cast
 Luke - Artist (Season 2)
 Eddie - Artist (Season 2)
 Nice Guy - Artist (Season 2)

Current
 Ami James — Shop owner and famed tattoo artist from Miami Ink
 Rodrigo Canteras
 Morgwn Pennypacker
 Paulo Benevides
 Chris Garver
 Guy Waisman

Celebrity appearances

 Corey Taylor, lead vocalist of Slipknot and Stone Sour
 Method Man, actor and rapper of the Wu-Tang Clan
 Dawn Harlot Dupre, guitarist and vocalist of Bambi Killers
 Djinji Brown, lead vocalist of Absolution
 LaMarr Woodley, linebacker for the Pittsburgh Steelers
 Robert Vaughn, fashion designer for Von Dutch
 Angelina Pivarnick, former Jersey Shore cast member
 Jenna Morasca, Survivor: The Amazon winner
 Ethan Zohn, Survivor: Africa winner
 Alan Robert, bass guitarist/backing vocals of Life of Agony and comic book writer/artist
 Beth Shak, professional poker player
 James Durbin, American Idol season 10 finalist
 Tila Tequilla, reality star, model and singer
 Marky Ramone, former drummer of The Ramones
 John Forté, musician, Grammy nominated producer for The Fugees and activist
 Mauro Castano, Carlo's Bake Shop pastry chef and Bartolo "Buddy" Valastro's right-hand man on Cake Boss
 Bai Ling, actress
 Joe Letz, drummer of Combichrist
 Chris Motionless, lead vocalist of Motionless in White
 Tami Ferraiuolo, cast member of 60 Days In Season 1
 Shadia and Bilal Amen, members of the Amen family from All-American Muslim
 Sadat X, rapper from Brand Nubian
 Frank Iero, rhythm guitarist of My Chemical Romance, Pencey Prep and the lead vocalist of Leathermouth

Episodes

Series overview

Season 1 (2011)

Season 2 (2011-2012)

Season 3 (2013)

See also
List of tattoo TV shows

References

2010s American reality television series
2011 American television series debuts
2013 American television series endings
Television shows set in New York City
English-language television shows
TLC (TV network) original programming
American television spin-offs
Reality television spin-offs
Television series set in tattoo shops